The 1960 All-Big Ten Conference football team consists of American football players chosen by various organizations for All-Big Ten Conference teams for the 1960 Big Ten Conference football season.

All-Big Ten selections

Quarterbacks
 Tom Matte, Ohio State (AP-1 [halfback]; UPI-1 [quarterback])
 Wilburn Hollis, Iowa (AP-1)
 Ron Miller, Wisconsin (AP-2)
 Bernie Allen, Purdue (AP-2)

Halfbacks
 Larry Ferguson, Iowa (AP-1; UPI-1)
 Herb Adderly, Michigan State (UPI-1)
 Willie Jones, Purdue (AP-2)
 Bill Brown, Illinois (AP-2)

Fullbacks
 Bob Ferguson, Ohio State (AP-1; UPI-1)

Ends
 Earl Faison, Indiana (AP-1; UPI-1)
 Elbert Kimbrough, Northwestern (AP-1; UPI-1)
Pat Richter, Wisconsin (AP-2)
Tom Perdue, Ohio State (AP-2)

Tackles
 Jerry Beabout, Purdue (AP-1; UPI-1)
Joe Rutgens, Illinois (AP-1)
 Jim Tyrer, Ohio State (AP-2; UPI-1)
Francis Brizius, Minnesota (AP-2)

Guards
 Tom Brown, Minnesota (AP-1; UPI-1)
 Mark Manders, Iowa (AP-1; UPI-1)
Mike Ingram, Ohio State (AP-2)
Ron Maltony, Purdue (AP-2)

Centers
 Greg Larson, Minnesota (AP-1; UPI-1) 
 Jerry Smith, Michigan (AP-2; UPI-2)

Key
AP = Associated Press

UPI = United Press International, selected by the conference coaches

Bold = Consensus first-team selection of both the AP and UPI

See also
1960 College Football All-America Team

References

All-Big Ten Conference
All-Big Ten Conference football teams